Edward Baker-Duly is a British actor who lives in New York City, New York.

Biography
He was born in Stockholm, Sweden of British and Swedish parents and has lived in the United Kingdom, Ethiopia, and South Africa.

His UK television work includes playing no-nonsense sports master Chris Malachay in the long-running BBC school drama, Grange Hill, from 2003–2006. Previously he had played Joe Fisher, the Australian partner of gay builder Jason Kirk, in the ITV1 soap Emmerdale. He completed filming Botched alongside Stephen Dorff in 2006, and more recently played the entrepreneur Hermann Hauser in the BBC comedy drama show Micro Men. In December 2010 he played Joachim von Ribbentrop in the BBC Wales/Masterpiece reprise of Upstairs, Downstairs.

In theatre he has appeared in West Side Story directed by Arthur Laurents, South Pacific, directed by Trevor Nunn and  originated the role of Ashley Wilkes in Trevor Nunn's West End musical adaptation of Gone With The Wind in 2008. He has also appeared in Rookery Nook at the Menier Chocolate Factory.

He created the role of the Tin Man in Andrew Lloyd Webber's West End production of The Wizard of Oz. He also portrays Aunt Em and Uncle Henry's farmhand, Hickory, who is the Tin Man's Kansas counterpart.

In 2013 he moved to New York City, where he and his  wife Caroline, son Miles, and daughter Iris now reside, and appeared in the Off-Broadway production of Peter and the Starcatcher. In 2016, he appeared in the Showtime series Billions first season's final episode "The Conversation". In 2021, he appeared in Hollyoaks as Clarke.

Filmography

Film

Television

References

External links
 

Living people
Male actors from Stockholm
Year of birth missing (living people)
South African male television actors
Swedish emigrants to South Africa
South African emigrants to the United Kingdom
British male television actors
South African people of British descent